Eugen Schmidberger, Internationale Transporte und Planzüge v Austria (2003) C-112/00 is an EU law case, concerning the free movement of goods in the European Union.

Facts 
Schmidberger, who ran a trucking company, claimed damages for loss caused by a protest group that had prevented it taking goods to Austria by lorry. Transitforum Austria Tirol organised a demonstration to block the Brenner Autobahn, A13, a transit between Northern Europe and Italy. It did so for 30 hours, in protest against the environment and health problems from the increase in movement of heavy goods on the motorway.

Judgment
The Court of Justice held that Austria's failure to ban the demonstration infringed article 34 and 35 TFEU, and TEU art 4(3). However this was justified by the fundamental right of demonstrators to freedom of expression and assembly under the ECHR, national constitution and principles that were an integral part of EU law. Human rights were a fundamental principle in EU law, and free expression and association among the 'fundamental pillars of a democratic society'. They could only be restricted if 'the restrictions in fact correspond to objectives of general interest and do not, taking account of the aim of the restrictions, constitute disproportionate and unacceptable interference, impairing the very substance of the rights guaranteed.’

See also

European Union law

References

European Union goods case law
2003 in case law
2003 in Austria
Road transport in Austria